Oscar Jack Piastri (born 6 April 2001) is an Australian racing driver driving for McLaren in the 2023 Formula One World Championship. He previously served as the reserve driver for Alpine F1 Team, having been in the team's driver academy.

He won the 2019 Formula Renault Eurocup with R-ace GP, and won the 2020 FIA Formula 3 Championship and 2021 Formula 2 Championship with Prema Racing. He is only the sixth driver to win the GP2/Formula 2 Championship in their rookie season, and the fifth driver to win the GP3/Formula 3 Championship and the GP2/Formula 2 Championship in consecutive seasons. Due to his success in lower formulae, Piastri is widely considered as one of the most promising young drivers in motorsport.

Junior career

Karting 
Born in Melbourne, Australia, Piastri started racing remote controlled cars at a national level before beginning his karting career in 2011. Having gone professional and competed in various Australian races and championships in 2014, Piastri began competing in European and other CIK-FIA sanctioned karting championships with Ricky Flynn Motorsport the following year. He moved to the United Kingdom to further his racing career in 2016, finishing sixth in the 2016 World Championship in Bahrain.

Formula 4

2016 

In early 2016, Piastri landed his first major sponsorship, HP Tuners (founded and owned by his father), which helped fund his racing career.  This was displayed when on his racing suit and car during the GP3 Series, F3 and F2 season.  Later in 2016, Piastri made his single-seater debut in selected rounds of the Formula 4 UAE Championship with Dragon F4, claiming two podiums to take sixth in the championship.

2017 
In 2017, Piastri was named as part of the TRS Arden Junior Racing Team's line-up for the British F4 championship. There he claimed six wins and six pole positions to finish as runner-up to Jamie Caroline.

In September 2022, Red Bull Racing principal Christian Horner revealed that he missed a chance to sign Piastri to their junior team during his Formula 4 years.

GP3 Series 
In December 2018, Piastri took part in the post-season test at Yas Marina with Trident.

Formula Renault Eurocup

2018 

In 2018, Piastri made his debut in the championship, reuniting with Arden. Claiming three podiums, with a highest placed finish of second at the second race at Hockenheim, he finished the season ninth in the championship.

2019 
In December 2018, it was announced Piastri would switch to reigning team champions R-ace GP for the 2019 championship. He claimed his first victory in the series at Silverstone and repeated with a second win at the same venue a day later. He became the first driver to win three races in 2019 after taking victory at Spa-Francorchamps in July, and became the champion after taking a win and fourth place at the final round at Yas Marina.

FIA Formula 3 Championship 
In October 2019, Piastri joined the post-season test with reigning FIA Formula 3 team champions Prema Racing. In January 2020, the Italian outfit signed Piastri to contest the upcoming season, alongside Logan Sargeant and 2019 Formula Regional European champion Frederik Vesti.

Piastri started third on the grid for his debut race at the Red Bull Ring. He collided with pole-sitter Sebastián Fernández at the first corner but avoided damage and went on to take victory. He then stated that "he thought [his] first Formula 3 race had ended in the first 10 seconds." Piastri took three consecutive second-place finishes at both Hungaroring races and the first Silverstone feature race, before his first retirement of the season came at the following Silverstone sprint race when a stuck-open DRS forced him to withdraw. Teammate Sargeant took the lead of the championship from Piastri at the second Silverstone feature race after Piastri struggled with reliability issues in qualifying. Piastri started fifth for the sprint race in Barcelona, but overtook multiple cars to take the lead before the end of the first lap. He held his position to take his second victory. Piastri reclaimed the championship lead after finishing fifth at the following Spa-Francorchamps feature race, but dropped back again after being penalised for an illegal overtake in the sprint race, which Sargeant won.

Piastri was penalised in qualifying at Monza for impeding Jake Hughes and started the feature race in 15th place. He charged to third place by the end of the race, benefiting from Sargeant being involved in a collision to retake the championship lead. Piastri retired from the sprint race after he was hit by Clément Novalak, but was also issued a five-place grid penalty for the next race for earlier forcing David Beckmann off the track. Despite his retirement, Piastri maintained the lead of the championship after his teammates collided with each other.

Piastri lined up 16th on the grid for the final feature race at the Mugello Circuit and failed to score points after finishing 11th. Title rival Sargeant finished sixth, leaving both drivers tied on 160 points going into the final race. Sargeant started the sprint race six places ahead of Piastri, but was eliminated after a collision on the first lap. Piastri's only remaining title rival, Théo Pourchaire, was unable to bridge the points gap and Piastri finished seventh to claim the championship title, three points ahead of Pourchaire and four ahead of Sargeant.

FIA Formula 2 Championship 

In December 2020, Piastri announced that he would continue with Prema Racing into Formula 2, replacing the departing Mick Schumacher and partnering Ferrari Driver Academy member Robert Shwartzman for the  season. Piastri finished fifth in his debut race. In the second race, Piastri started from sixth and made up places before overtaking fellow Alpine junior Zhou Guanyu  on the final lap to take the lead, claiming his first Formula 2 race win. Piastri started the feature race from eighth place but passed multiple cars to take the lead by lap 13 of 32. He was later forced into retirement after making contact with Dan Ticktum and spinning with two laps remaining. Piastri took consecutive second-place finishes at the Monaco round to take second place in the championship standings behind Zhou.

Piastri retired from the first sprint race in Baku after a collision on the first lap, but finished second in the feature race. He claimed pole position at Silverstone, and took the lead of the championship after finishing sixth in the first sprint race. At the conclusion of the fourth round, he held the championship lead by five points over Zhou. At Monza, Piastri took his first feature win in the series which included a battle on lap 25 with Zhou, and increased his championship lead with another pole and win at Sochi. Piastri became the second driver that season after Jüri Vips to win two races on the same weekend, finishing first in Jeddah's second sprint race and being in the lead at the time the feature race was aborted. The Australian clinched the title with a podium in race one at Yas Marina, thus becoming the third driver to win the championship in their rookie season. He capped off his season with a win in the feature race, his fourth in a row, which meant that Piastri had won six races, more than any other driver that season.

With his championship, Piastri joined an illustrious company of Nico Rosberg, Lewis Hamilton, Nico Hülkenberg, Charles Leclerc, and George Russell, as the only drivers to win the GP2/F2 title in their rookie seasons. He also became just the fifth driver after Hamilton, Hülkenberg, Leclerc and Russell to win the GP3/F3 title, and then the GP2/F2 title the following year, and the first driver to win three consecutive F1 feeder series' championships, with his 2019 Formula Renault Eurocup title.

Formula One 
Piastri joined the Renault Sport Academy in January 2020. After winning the FIA Formula 3 Championship in 2020, he took part in his first Formula One test in October with the Renault F1 Team, driving the Renault R.S.18 at Bahrain International Circuit alongside fellow academy drivers Christian Lundgaard and Zhou Guanyu. He remained part of the now-rebranded Alpine Academy in 2021 and drove the Alpine A521 in the post-season young drivers' test at Yas Marina Circuit in December.

After his Formula 2 title victory, Piastri was appointed as Alpine F1 Team's reserve driver for the  season. He was also made available as a reserve driver for McLaren following an agreement between the two teams. He took part in Alpine's testing sessions in the A521 throughout the season, including at the Circuit of the Americas, Losail International Circuit and Silverstone Circuit. McLaren team principal Andreas Seidl confirmed that Piastri had a private two day testing session in a previous-spec McLaren car at Circuit Paul Ricard the week before the São Paulo Grand Prix.

Contract dispute and Contract Recognition Board hearing 
However, in August, Alonso announced that he would leave the team to replace the retiring Sebastian Vettel at Aston Martin. Alpine announced Piastri would replace Alonso in 2023, although the press release contained no quotes from Piastri himself. Piastri rejected Alpine's announcement via a post on Twitter, stating that he had not signed a contract with the team and that he would not be driving for them in 2023. Alpine team principal Otmar Szafnauer followed up by criticising Piastri's actions and "integrity as a human being", saying that he expected loyalty from the former academy driver, and threatened to take the contract matters to court.

A hearing of the FIA's Contract Recognition Board (CRB) commenced on 29 August 2022 with the intention of determining whether Piastri was contracted to Alpine, or if he was free to join a different team for 2023. Had Alpine won their case with the board, the team could have obligated Piastri to fulfil his contract and race for them in 2023, or it could have sought a compensation fee for Piastri's services from any other interested teams. Prior to Dutch Grand Prix, the CRB ruled against Alpine, with Piastri's move to McLaren confirmed shortly thereafter.  In their final judgement the CRB also revealed the date on which Piastri had formally signed his McLaren contract which was the 4 July 2022 – one day after the British Grand Prix had taken place. This contract initially only guaranteed Piastri with a reserve role for 2023, with an upgrade to a race seat dependent on the Woking team being able to agree a contract termination with Daniel Ricciardo – which was agreed upon prior to the Belgian Grand Prix. Piastri said a "breakdown in trust" between him and Alpine was behind his decision to leave the Enstone-based team.

McLaren (2023–)

2023 season 
Piastri races for McLaren in 2023 alongside Lando Norris. Alpine agreed to end Piastri's contract early to allow Piastri to join McLaren in the post-season testing session immediately after the 2022 Abu Dhabi Grand Prix. In his first race in the Bahrain Grand Prix, Piastri was the first to retire from the race on lap 14, where his car failed to restart after a steering wheel change.

Karting record

Karting career summary

Racing record

Racing career summary

† As Piastri was a guest driver, he was ineligible for points.
 Season still in progress.

Complete Formula 4 UAE Championship results 
(key) (Races in bold indicate pole position; races in italics indicate fastest lap)

Complete F4 British Championship results 
(key) (Races in bold indicate pole position) (Races in italics indicate fastest lap)

Complete Formula Renault Northern European Cup results 
(key) (Races in bold indicate pole position) (Races in italics indicate fastest lap)

† As Piastri was a guest driver, he was ineligible to score points.

Complete Formula Renault Eurocup results 
(key) (Races in bold indicate pole position) (Races in italics indicate fastest lap)

Complete FIA Formula 3 Championship results 
(key) (Races in bold indicate pole position; races in italics indicate points for the fastest lap of top ten finishers)

‡ Half points awarded as less than 75% of race distance was completed.

Complete FIA Formula 2 Championship results 
(key) (Races in bold indicate pole position) (Races in italics indicate points for the fastest lap of top ten finishers)

† Driver did not finish the race, but was classified as he completed over 90% of the race distance.‡ Half points awarded as less than 75% of race distance was completed.

Complete Formula One results 
(key) (Races in bold indicate pole position) (Races in italics indicate fastest lap)

* Season still in progress.

References

External links
Oscar Piastri official website

2001 births
Living people
Australian racing drivers
Australian people of Italian descent
British F4 Championship drivers
Formula Renault Eurocup drivers
People from Melbourne
Formula Renault 2.0 NEC drivers
FIA Formula 3 Championship drivers
FIA Formula 2 Championship drivers
Arden International drivers
R-ace GP drivers
Prema Powerteam drivers
FIA Formula 2 Champions
FIA Formula 3 Champions
Karting World Championship drivers
People educated at Haileybury and Imperial Service College
Australian Formula One drivers
UAE F4 Championship drivers
McLaren Formula One drivers